Mount Hunter, is a 2,032-metre (6,667-feet) mountain in the Murray Range of the Hart Ranges in Northern British Columbia. The mountain is within the Pine-Lemoray Provincial Park.

References 

Two-thousanders of British Columbia
Northern Interior of British Columbia
Canadian Rockies
Peace River Land District